Vitor District is one of twenty-nine districts of the province Arequipa in Peru.

References

External links

Districts of the Arequipa Province
Districts of the Arequipa Region